William Slaughter may refer to:
 William B. Slaughter (politician), American politician
 William B. Slaughter (rancher), American rancher, cattle driver, banker and county judge
 Billy Slaughter, American actor
 William Capel Slaughter, co-founder of international law firm Slaughter and May